Mary Tedeschi Eberstadt is an American essayist, novelist, and author of several books of nonfiction. Her writing has appeared in publications including Quillette, TIME, the Wall Street Journal, the Washington Post, National Review, First Things, The Weekly Standard, and other venues. In March 2017, she was named senior research fellow at the Faith & Reason Institute. Eberstadt spoke at the Edmund Burke Foundation's inaugural National Conservatism Conference in July, 2019.

Education and personal life 
Eberstadt grew up in rural upstate New York. She graduated magna cum laude in 1983 from Cornell University, where she was a four-year Telluride Scholar. Eberstadt is married to author and demographer Nicholas Eberstadt.

Professional career 
Eberstadt has written for a wide variety of magazines and newspapers. New York Times columnist David Brooks has twice awarded Eberstadt's writing a "Sidney," his annual award for best essay writing of the year. Columnist George Will has called Eberstadt "intimidatingly intelligent," and author George Weigel has called her "our premier analyst of American cultural foibles and follies, with a keen eye for oddities that illuminate just how strange the country's moral culture has become."

In 2016, HarperCollins published Eberstadt's latest book, It's Dangerous to Believe: Religious Freedom and Its Enemies, which chronicles the rise in discrimination against religious believers in the United States and elsewhere during an era of ascendant secularism. The book argues that the sexual revolution has inadvertently generated a new, rival, secularist Western faith, complete with quasi-religious ritual and theology; and that this new secularist faith must learn to coexist in civility alongside traditional Judeo-Christianity, rather than seeking to drive other men and women of faith from the public square.

Thomas Farr of the Religious Freedom Project said that "every man and woman of the left should read this book." Robert P. George called it "a powerful manifesto." Russell D. Moore of the Southern Baptist Convention said that "this book will equip you to know what's happening to America's first freedom and will inspire you to act."

In its review of the book, Publishers Weekly noted the one-sided nature of her arguments: "Casting believers almost entirely as innocent victims without any political or cultural power causes the work to lose some nuance, as does her assertion that Western secularism places Islam off limits for critique. For traditional Christians, Eberstadt provides a language to defend their position, a comforting sense that their persecution is real, and a view of the irony of progressives curtailing freedom....[T]he final chapter's call to attend to rhetoric and avoid generalization powerfully makes the case for more civility in the midst of intense disagreement." Writing in the Weekly Standard, Jonathan Last called the book "brilliant" and a "tour de force, essential reading for anyone wondering how our civilization can survive the current moment."

Eberstadt is the author of several other books, including How the West Really Lost God, published in 2013. How the West Really Lost God, fortified with an intensive study of both historical data and contemporary popular culture, proffers the original thesis that the undermining of the family in Western culture has in turn helped power religious decline. Francis Fukuyama wrote of the book, "Mary Eberstadt is one of the most acute and creative social observers of our time. She is not afraid to challenge received wisdom and her insights are always well worth pondering." Rodney Stark called the book "A brilliant contribution to the really big question about the future of the West, and a pleasure to read."

The review in The Economist said that the "elegantly written book repeatedly shows that strong families help to keep religious practice alive, and that too many people see a causal connection running exclusively in the opposite direction." Writing in The American Conservative, Rod Dreher called the book "stunning," adding that "Eberstadt's contribution is to make an argument that not only does religion cause family formation, but family formation causes religion."

Eberstadt also authored Adam and Eve After the Pill: Paradoxes of the Sexual Revolution, published in 2012. The book examines how the sexual revolution has produced widespread discontent among men and women, and has harmed the weakest members of society. Eberstadt explores the portrayal of the sexual revolution in pop culture voices, pinpointing "a wildly contradictory mix of chatter about how wonderful it is that women are now all liberated for sexual fun--and how mysteriously impossible it has become to find a good, steady, committed boyfriend at the same time." A review in the Washington Times stated that "in this concise, elegantly written book, Eberstadt marries brilliant analytical power with wry wit" and called it "an enormous contribution to understanding both modern moral culture and the significance of current political debate."

Eberstadt's first book, Home-Alone America: The Hidden Toll of Day Care, Behavioral Drugs and Other Parent Substitutes, argued that separating children from family members at early ages is linked to childhood problems such as obesity and rising rates of mental and behavioral disorders. The book also connected these problems to popular culture, particularly as reflected in adolescent music (including the award-winning chapter, "Eminem is Right"). R. Albert Mohler, president of the Southern Baptist Theological Seminary, called it "a book that should be read by every concerned parent, pastor, and policy maker."

Eberstadt served as a senior fellow at Stanford University's Hoover Institution from 2002 to 2013. From 1990 to 1998, Eberstadt was executive editor of National Interest magazine. From 1985 and 1987, she was a member of the Policy Planning Staff at the US State Department and a speechwriter for then Secretary of State George P. Shultz. From 1984 to 1985, she was a special assistant to Ambassador Jeane Kirkpatrick. Eberstadt was also a managing editor of the Public Interest.

Eberstadt is also the founder of the Kirkpatrick Society, named after her late mentor, Jeane Kirkpatrick. Founded in 2011, the Kirkpatrick Society is based in Washington, D.C. and is a professional and literary society for women working in journalism, government, television, radio, book editing, think tanks, and foundations. The Kirkpatrick Society is made up of over 300 women and meets on a monthly basis. As of January 2017, the American Enterprise Institute assumed responsibility for the management and operations of the Kirkpatrick Society.

On March 15, 2017, Eberstadt became a senior research fellow at the Faith & Reason Institute.

In 2019, Eberstadt released Primal Screams. Wherein she postulates that the sexual revolution and female contraception of the 1960s contributed to identity politics. She says that it contributed to premarital sex, skyrocketing rates of abortion, fatherless homes, family shrinkage and family breakup. She especially blame smaller families for a lack of family role models for young people, and thus a breakdown of understanding between genders. The end of the family and church-life is deemed as the cause why people seek belonging in identity politics.

Animal welfare

Eberstadt is known for her writings on animal welfare, and the moral connections she draws between the anti-abortion and pro-animal movements. Her widely discussed 2009 essay in First Things, "Pro-Animal, Pro-Life," was followed by a number of other, related pieces on the subject, among them "The Truth About Religion and Animals," "Support for Animal Welfare Grows on the Right," and "Why Animal Lovers Should Abhor Planned Parenthood."

The Loser Letters  
Eberstadt published her first work of fiction in 2010, The Loser Letters: A Comic Tale of Life, Death, and Atheism. The book satirically follows the experiences of a young Christian converting to atheism. P. J. O'Rourke wrote that "Mary Eberstadt is the rightful heir and assignée of CS Lewis, and her heroine in The Loser Letters is the legitimate child (or perhaps grandchild) of 'the patient' in The Screwtape Letters."

Playwright and director Jeffrey Fiske adapted the book for the stage, which had its world premiere at The Catholic University of America in September 2016 starring World Champion and Olympic Gymnast Chellsie Memmel. According to Kathryn Jean Lopez of National Review, "The timing of this adaptation by playwright Jeffrey Fiske may just be an opportunity to catch millennial "nones" with an invitation. It's also a nudge to conservatives and others to get creative. Polemics alone won't change the world." Writing also for National Review, Stanley Kurtz noted that this play could serve as a test of free speech on other college campuses. "What if The Loser Letters were to go on a tour that included some secular colleges?," he asked. "I'd like to believe the play would be courteously received at any school, but I can't help feeling that heads might explode—with protests or worse to follow. I only hope we get a chance to find out."

Recognition 
In 2014, Eberstadt gave Seton Hall University's commencement address and was awarded an honorary degree. The choice of Eberstadt as the school's commencement speaker brought dissent from some faculty members, who objected that her values were not consistent with those of the university.  USA Today listed Eberstadt's address in its compilation of notable 2014 commencement speeches, alongside the speeches of John Kerry, John Legend, and Eric Holder.

In 2014, the Siena Symposium for Women, Family, and Culture at St. Thomas University in Minnesota awarded Eberstadt a Humanitarian Leadership Award. She also received a Leadership Award from the Catholic Lawyers' Guild of Nebraska that same year. In 2009, Mt. St. Mary's University in Emmitsburg, Maryland awarded its Presidential Medal of Honor to Eberstadt and her husband, Nicholas.

References

External links 

 
 

20th-century American essayists
21st-century American novelists
21st-century American essayists
21st-century American women writers
American animal welfare scholars
American magazine editors
American Roman Catholics
Cornell University alumni
Hoover Institution people
Critics of atheism
Living people
Year of birth missing (living people)
American women essayists
American women novelists
Women magazine editors